Against All Odds is a lost 1924 American silent Western film directed by Edmund Mortimer and starring Buck Jones. It was produced and distributed by Fox Film Corporation.

Cast
 Buck Jones as Chick Newton
 Dolores Rousse as Judy Malone
 Ben Hendricks Jr. as Jim Sawyer
 William Scott as Bill Warner
 Thais Valdemar as Olivetta
 William N. Bailey as  Tom Curtis
 Bernard Siegel as Lewis
 Jack McDonald as Warner's Uncle

See also
 1937 Fox vault fire

References

External links
  Against All Odds at IMDb.com
 

1924 films
Films based on short fiction
Lost Western (genre) films
Films directed by Edmund Mortimer
Fox Film films
1924 Western (genre) films
Lost American films
1924 lost films
Silent American Western (genre) films
1920s American films
1920s English-language films